A Single Man is a 1964 novel by Christopher Isherwood.

Set in Southern California during 1962, shortly after the Cuban Missile Crisis, it depicts one day in the life of George, a middle-aged Englishman who is a professor at a Los Angeles university. The university might reflect CSULA, where Christopher Isherwood taught for some time. The novel is also believed to be informed by a crisis in Isherwood's relationship with Don Bachardy.

In 2009, fashion designer Tom Ford directed a film adaptation of the novel, with additions made to the original plot in the screenplay by David Scearce and Ford. Ford also contributed a foreword to a re-release of the novel.

Plot
George is still grieving after the recent death of his long-term partner, Jim. He is unable to cope with the despondent, bereaved nature of his existence. George goes through his day having various encounters with different people that colour his senses and illuminate the possibilities of being alive and human in the world.

At the university where he works as a lecturer, he discusses one of Aldous Huxley's books with the students. One of them, Kenny, strikes up a conversaton with him after the lecture. The two walk to a bookshop where Kenny buys George a pencil sharpener as a gift. Later, George goes to a hospital to visit Jim's lover, Doris, who survived the accident in which Jim died. She is frail and not expected to live for much longer. George goes to the gym and then visits his friend, a fellow English expatriat Charlotte. They have dinner and drink a lot.

George goes to The Starboard Side, a local pub. There, he encounters Kenny, who, it turns out, had come here expecting to see George. They drink and talk, flirting between the lines. Kenny suggests that they go for a swim and they both go in the sea naked. George suggests that they go to his place. There, they talk some more, but after a misunderstanding, George falls asleep and Kenny leaves his house. George wakes up, reads a note that Kenny had left behind, falls back asleep, and dies peacefully.

Characters

 George
 Jim
 Mr. Strunk
 Mrs. Strunk
 Mr. Garfein
 Mrs. Garfein
 Charlotte
 Kenny Potter
 Lois Yamaguchi
 Russ Dreyer
 Alexander Mong
 Tom Kugelman
 Buddy Sorensen
 Sister Maria
 Mr. Stoessel
 Mrs. Netta Torres
 Dr. Gottlieb
 Myron Hirsch
 Wally Bryant
 Estelle Oxford
 Grant Lefanu
 Cynthia Leach
 Andy Leach
 Doris
 Buck
 Rick
 Two young men playing tennis

References

1964 British novels
1964 American novels
1960s LGBT novels
British novels adapted into films
American novels adapted into films
Novels by Christopher Isherwood
Novels set in Los Angeles
Novels set in one day
Fiction set in 1962
Novels with gay themes
Methuen Publishing books

pl:Samotny mężczyzna (powieść)